Ronald Wallwork (born 26 May 1941) is a retired male race walker from England, who represented his home nation at two Commonwealth Games.

Athletics career
He represented England and won a gold medal in the 20 miles walk, at the 1966 British Empire and Commonwealth Games in Kingston, Jamaica.

Four years later he competed in the 20 miles walk again at the 1970 British Commonwealth Games in Edinburgh, Scotland.

He is still very active in the race walking community organizing;
 the Enfield League, the largest group of races within the UK,
 the 24-hour/100-mile challenge 2009,
 the 1000 mile Captain Barclay Bicentenary Celebrity Challenge Walk with jockey Richard Dunwoody.

International competitions

References

sporting-heroes
Results

1941 births
Living people
English male racewalkers
British male racewalkers
Commonwealth Games gold medallists for England
Commonwealth Games medallists in athletics
Athletes (track and field) at the 1966 British Empire and Commonwealth Games
Athletes (track and field) at the 1970 British Commonwealth Games
Medallists at the 1966 British Empire and Commonwealth Games